Ashford Hill is a village in Basingstoke and Deane, Hampshire, England.

Governance
The village of Ashford Hill is part of the civil parish of Ashford Hill with Headley, and is part of the Kingsclere ward of Basingstoke and Deane borough council. The borough council is a Non-metropolitan district of Hampshire County Council.

Geography
The village has a National nature reserve which is called Ashford Hill National nature reserve.

References

External links

Villages in Hampshire